The men's 10 kilometres walk event was part of the track and field athletics programme at the 1920 Summer Olympics. The competition was held on Tuesday, August 17, 1920, and on Wednesday, August 18, 1920. Twenty-three race walkers from 13 nations competed.

Records

These were the standing world and Olympic records (in minutes) prior to the 1920 Summer Olympics.

Results

Semifinals

The semifinals were held on Tuesday, August 17, 1920.

Semifinal 1

This heat was one lap short, so the distance of this race was only 9600 metres.

Semifinal 2

Final

The final was held on Wednesday, August 18, 1920.

Before the race started Frigerio handed the conductor of the mid-field band several sheets of music, which he requested to be played during the race. He won so easily that he stopped once to show the band the correct tempo...

References

Sources
 
 

Walk 10 kilometre
Racewalking at the Olympics